Turners Falls is an unincorporated village and census-designated place in the town of Montague in Franklin County, Massachusetts, United States. The population was 4,512 at the 2020 census. It is part of the Springfield, Massachusetts Metropolitan Statistical Area. Its name is generally used as a metonym for the entire town of Montague, for which it is the business district and comprises more than half the population.

Geography
Turners Falls is located at  (42.598943, -72.556809).

Demographics

As of the census of 2020, there were 4,512 people, 2,015 households, and 1,153 families residing in the CDP. The population density was 866.0/km (2,239.0/mi). There were 2,145 housing units at an average density of 418.3/km (1,081.4/mi). The racial makeup of the CDP was 94.93% White, 0.74% African American, 0.34% Native American, 0.97% Asian, 0.11% Pacific Islander, 0.79% from other races, and 2.12% from two or more races. Hispanic or Latino of any race were 3.49% of the population.

There were 1,995 households, out of which 27.7% had children under the age of 18 living with them, 39.2% were married couples living together, 14.0% had a female householder with no husband present, and 42.2% were non-families. 35.7% of all households were made up of individuals, and 17.0% had someone living alone who was 65 years of age or older. The average household size was 2.22 and the average family size was 2.87.

In the CDP, the population was spread out, with 23.9% under the age of 18, 8.8% from 18 to 24, 26.4% from 25 to 44, 22.2% from 45 to 64, and 18.7% who were 65 years of age or older. The median age was 39 years. For every 100 females, there were 90.2 males. For every 100 females age 18 and over, there were 86.3 males.

The median income for a household in the CDP was $24,243, and the median income for a family was $38,041. Males had a median income of $30,997 versus $25,444 for females. The per capita income for the CDP was $16,446. About 13.4% of families and 18.9% of the population were below the poverty line, including 28.6% of those under age 18 and 8.9% of those age 65 or over.

History and culture

The village of Turners Falls was founded in 1868 as a planned industrial community according to the plan of Alvah Crocker, a prominent man from Fitchburg who envisioned in the immense power of the waterfalls the means of establishing a great city.  Crocker was influenced by other, earlier and successful experiments in Lowell and elsewhere.  Crocker's vision was to attract industry to the town by offering cheap hydropower that was made by the harnessing of the Connecticut River, through the construction of a dam and canal.  His development concept was to sell mill sites along the power canal to those companies and to sell individual building lots to mill workers who would come to work in the mills.  The rest of the village was laid out in a horizontal grid pattern with cross streets numerically.  Avenue A, the main commercial district, was designed as a grand tree lined avenue.

Turners Falls Massacre

The largest of five villages, Turners Falls was named after Captain William Turner, who played a key role in the region's Indian Wars.  In 1676, during King Philip's War, Captain Turner led a group of about 160 mounted soldiers from Hadley and made a surprise attack on an Indian encampment located near the falls.  The attack on a sleeping village of Native Americans on the Gill side of the Great Falls lasted several hours and resulted in the death of many people including many women and children. The area by the falls was traditionally shared by the Pocumtuk Confederacy, the Narragansetts, the Nipmucs, the Wampanoag, and the Wabanaki tribes because of the abundance of salmon and shad available there.

Of the 160 participants, at least 40 were killed on the retreat. Some, including the Chaplain, Reverend Hope Atherton got separated from the main body and had to find their way alone; a few were successful while others never returned.
Captain Turner's body was found about a month later and was buried on a bluff west of where he fell. A tablet marks the spot today.
 
The Turners Falls massacre was called the Battle of Turner's Falls at the time and is often viewed as a turning point in the King Philip's War.  As the historian Russell Bourne points out, “After the Peskeompskut massacre, allied sachems openly discussed the strategy of King Phillip, the name given to the Native American leader Metacom, and sending his head to the English as a prelude to peace negotiations”.  Within one month of the massacre, the English offensive in the Connecticut Valley ended suddenly.  The end of King Philip's War came not long afterward.

In recognition of the tragic nature of the Turners Falls massacre, the Board of Selectmen and Town of Montague, as part of its 250th anniversary, joined with representatives of various Native American tribes on May 19, 2004, in a Reconciliation Day ceremony.

Historic district
The central portion of the village is a historic district on the National Register of Historic Places. Known as the Turners Falls Historic District, it is roughly bounded by the Connecticut River, Power Canal, 9th Street and L Street. The Renaissance Community owned several properties and businesses in downtown Turners Falls from 1972 to 1980.

Points of interest
 Turners Falls Canal
 Great Falls Discovery Center
 Gill–Montague Bridge
 The Shea Theater
 Canalside Rail Trail

Notable residents

Robert E. Bourdeau, astrophysicist and Explorer 8 Project Manager
Rico Brogna, former Major League baseball player
Philip H. Hoff (1924-2018), 73rd Governor of Vermont
Walter Kostanski (1923–2015), Massachusetts state representative and funeral director

See also
National Register of Historic Places listings in Franklin County, Massachusetts
Renaissance Community

References

External links 

 Turners Falls Water Department
 Turners Falls Fire Department
 Great Falls Discovery Center
 Town of Montague
 Shea Theater

Montague, Massachusetts
Census-designated places in Franklin County, Massachusetts
Historic districts on the National Register of Historic Places in Massachusetts
Massachusetts populated places on the Connecticut River
Springfield metropolitan area, Massachusetts
Census-designated places in Massachusetts
National Register of Historic Places in Franklin County, Massachusetts
1868 establishments in Massachusetts